Tommy Johansson is the name of:

 Tommy Johansson (musician) or ReinXeed (born 1987), Swedish musician 
 Tommy Johansson (sprinter) (born 1958), Swedish sprinter
 Tommy Johansson (speedway rider) (born 1950), Swedish speedway rider

See also
 Thomas Johansson (disambiguation)
 Tomas Johansson (disambiguation)